Robert Siatka (born 20 June 1934) is a French former football defender. He played for France in the Euro 1960.

Personal life
Siatka was born in France, and is of Polish descent. He is best known in club football for playing with Reims in their 1956 and 1959 European Cup finals.

With the death of Michel Hidalgo on 26 March 2020, Sitaka is the only living player from the first ever European Cup final.

References

 Profile

1934 births
Living people
French footballers
France international footballers
French people of Polish descent
Association football defenders
Ligue 1 players
Stade de Reims players
FC Nantes players
1960 European Nations' Cup players
French football managers
Bourges 18 managers
AC Avigonnnais managers